Tracy and Swartwout was a prominent New York City architectural firm headed by Evarts Tracy and Egerton Swartwout.

History
Evarts Tracy (1868–1922) was the son of first cousins Jeremiah Evarts Tracy and Martha Sherman Greene. His paternal grandmother Martha Sherman Evarts and maternal grandmother Mary Evarts were the sisters of William M. Evarts. Evarts Tracey graduated from Yale in 1890.

Egerton Swartwout (1870–1943) was the first son of  Satterlee Swartwout and Charlotte Elizabeth Edgerton (daughter of Ohio Representative Alfred Peck Edgerton). Swartwout graduated from Yale University in 1891.

Both Swartwout and Tracy had trained and worked as draftsmen with the renowned firm, McKim, Mead and White.

From 1904-1909, Tracy and Swartwout were joined by architect James Riely Gordon, forming the firm Gordon, Tracy & Swartwout.

In 1909-1912 the firm was joined by Electus Darwin Litchfield, a graduate of the Brooklyn Polytechnic Institute and the Stevens Institute of Technology. The firm was at this time named Tracy, Swartwout & Litchfield.

Evarts Tracy died January 31, 1922, in France, of chronic myocarditis. Egerton Swartwout continued working on his own after Evarts Tracy's death.

Buildings

References

External links
 preservationnj.org
 findagrave.com
 tilesinnewyork.blogspot.com
 andyswebtools.com

Tracy and Swartwout